Agromyces binzhouensis is a Gram-positive, heterotrophic, non-spore-forming and rod-shaped bacterium from the genus of Agromyces which has been isolated from soil from the Yellow River delta from Binzhou in China.

References 

Microbacteriaceae
Bacteria described in 2016